Marc Groß (born August 12, 1987) is a German footballer who plays as a defensive midfielder.

External links

Marc Groß at Kicker

1987 births
Living people
German footballers
1. FC Kaiserslautern II players
SV Elversberg players
3. Liga players
Association football midfielders